The Bestune E01 is an electric compact crossover made by Bestune.

Overview

The Bestune E01 was first shown at the 2020 Auto China. The E01 comes with a 3D holographic assistant. Its dimensions measure 4,639 mm/1,880 mm/1,640 mm, and can seat 5. It has a 61.34 kWh battery, 190 horsepower, a range of 450 km, and a top speed of 170 km/h.

See also
Bestune
Bestune T77

References

Cars introduced in 2020
Cars of China
Production electric cars
Crossover sport utility vehicles